Aero República S.A. (trading as Wingo) is a low-cost airline owned by Copa Holdings. Copa announced the creation of Wingo in October 19, 2016 as a replacement for most of its Copa Airlines Colombia business, which had been losing money for several years, and which had lost $29.7 million in the first half of 2016. In November 2019, Wingo announced Carolina Cortizo as their appointed managing director.

History
Copa stated in 2016, that Wingo would be led by Catalina Bretón, a former JetBlue and Avianca executive, and that Eduardo Lombana, the CEO of Copa Colombia, would be in charge of the airline's administration, finance and operations. Copa said Wingo would use four Boeing 737-700s previously used by Copa, would fly under Copa Colombia's call sign and codes, and would mostly take over Copa Colombia's routes, adding flights from Bogotá and Medellín to Panama Pacifico airport. The new company would offer one class of seats and would charge for baggage, food and beverages, seat assignments, and priority boarding.

Wingo commenced operations on December 1, 2016, with a flight from Bogotá to Cancún.

Destinations

Wingo serves the following destinations as of September 2022:

Fleet

Current fleet

As of November 2022, Wingo used the following aircraft:

Former fleet
Wingo previously operated the following aircraft:

See also
List of airlines of Colombia

References

External links

Airlines of Colombia
Airlines established in 2016
Companies based in Bogotá
Colombian brands
Low-cost carriers
Colombian companies established in 2016